The 1944 Idaho gubernatorial election was held on November 7. Democratic nominee Charles Gossett defeated Republican nominee W. H. Detweiler for the open seat with 52.64% of the vote.

Incumbent governor C. A. Bottolfsen was the Republican nominee for the United States Senate, but was defeated by Democrat Glen Taylor in the general election.

Primary elections
Primary elections were held on June 13, 1944.

Democratic primary

Candidates
Charles Gossett, Nampa, former lieutenant governor
Calvin Wright, Burley, state auditor
George Curtis, secretary of state
Fred Porter, Idaho Falls

Republican primary

Candidates
W. H. Detweiler, Hazelton, former state legislator
M. L. Horsley, Soda Springs businessman, former house speaker
Edwin Nelson, Fenn, lieutenant governor
Harvey Schwendiman, Newdale, former state agriculture commissioner
Don Whitehead, Boise, former lieutenant governor and house speaker

General election

Candidates
Charles C. Gossett, Democratic
W. H. Detweiler, Republican

Results

References

1944
Idaho
Gubernatorial